The Parable of the Master and Servant is a parable told by Jesus in the New Testament, found only in Luke's Gospel. The parable teaches that when somebody "has done what God expects, he or she is only doing his or her duty."

Narrative 
The parable reads as follows:

Interpretation
This parable suggests that "even the best of God's servants are still unworthy because they have only done their duty and no more." Nobody, "no matter how virtuous or hardworking, can ever put God in his or her debt."

William Barclay relates the parable to the last verse of the Isaac Watts hymn "When I Survey the Wondrous Cross":

Were the whole realm of Nature mine,
That were an offering far too small;
Love so amazing, so divine,
Demands my soul, my life, my all.

The phrase "unworthy servant" in the last verse of the parable is widely used liturgically, such as in the Liturgy of St. John Chrysostom.

Scottish biblical writer William Nicoll refers to this story as "the parable of extra service".

See also
 Life of Jesus in the New Testament
 Ministry of Jesus
 Parable of the Two Debtors
 Parable of the Faithful Servant

References

Master and Servant, Parable of the
Gospel of Luke